The National Bureau of Classification (NBC), previously the Film Censor Board of Maldives, is a government office founded on 21 May 1956 with the objective of presenting and promoting cinema and theatrical performances for the benefit of the Maldivian people.

History and overview
The Government of Maldives first formed a Film Censor Board on 21 May 1956 under the President's Office. This Board was formed with the objective of presenting and promoting cinema and theatrical performances for the benefit of the Maldivian people.
On 15 May 1983 the Film Censor Board was transferred under the mandate of the Ministry of Home Affairs and Housing. The mission of the five-member Board was to check films and theatrical dramas to see if they had issues that conflicted:

1. The tenets of Islam.
2. The Constitution, Laws and Regulations of the Maldives.
3. The Maldivian Culture.

On 1 April 1998 the Film Censor Board became a subsidiary of the Ministry of Information, Arts and Culture and on 29 December 2005, the Film Censor Board was re-branded as the National Bureau of Classification, NBC. This change was brought as the government believed that classification and education was the key to manage and regulate different content so as to protect values of artistic productions and safeguard consumer interests at the same time. Presently, the National Bureau of Classification is under the Ministry of Arts, Culture and Heritage.

Film ratings
Classification Certificates issued by NBC are based on the following categories:

 G – General audiences.
 PG – Parental guidance.
12+ – For ages 12 and above.
15+ – Suitable for ages 15 and above.
18+ – Suitable for ages 18 and above.
18+R – Suitable for ages 18 and above. Restricted.
PU – For professional use only.

References

External links
 NBC homepage
 NBC facebook page

Motion picture rating systems
Entertainment rating organizations
Film censorship
Government of the Maldives
Mass media in the Maldives